Pedrito de Guzman "Bong" Galanza (born December 21, 1992) is a Filipino professional basketball player for the NLEX Road Warriors of the Philippine Basketball Association (PBA). He played college basketball at the University of the East. He was drafted with the 46th pick of the 2015 PBA draft by the GlobalPort Batang Pier. He is the former Team Captain of the University of the East.

PBA career statistics

As of the end of 2021 season

Season-by-season averages

|-
| align="left" | 
| align="left" rowspan="2" | Mahindra / Kia
| 3 || 11.0 || .200 || .000 || — || 1.3 || .3 || .3 || .3 || 1.3
|-
| align="left" | 
| 18 || 10.2 || .393 || .421 || .455 || .9 || .5 || .2 || .1 || 3.6
|-
| align="left" | 
| align="left" | Kia / NLEX
| 23 || 16.8 || .385 || .296 || .737 || 1.5 || .9 || .5 || .1 || 6.0
|-
| align="left" | 
| align="left" rowspan="3" | NLEX
| 33 || 21.2 || .404 || .328 || .730 || 2.2 || 1.2 || .4 || .2 || 7.8
|-
| align="left" | 
| 7 || 9.2 || .320 || .250 || 1.000 || .9 || .7 || .0 || .0 || 3.4
|-
| align="left" | 
| 3 || 5.0 || .222 || .400 || — || .7 || .0 || .0 || .1 || 2.0
|-class=sortbottom
| align=center colspan=2 | Career
| 87 || 15.9 || .385 || .321 || .708 || 1.6 || .9 || .3 || .1 || 5.7

References

External links
 Bong Galanza at HumbleBola
 Bong Galanza at RealGM

1992 births
Living people
Basketball players from Isabela (province)
Terrafirma Dyip players
Maharlika Pilipinas Basketball League players
Filipino men's basketball players
NLEX Road Warriors players
Shooting guards
Small forwards
UE Red Warriors basketball players
Ilocano people
NorthPort Batang Pier draft picks
Filipino men's 3x3 basketball players
PBA 3x3 players